Mişcarea femenistă was a newspaper from Chişinău, Bessarabia, founded in 1933.

References

Bibliography 
 Eugen Ştefan Holban, Dicţionar cronologic: Prin veacurile învolburate ale Moldovei dintre Prut şi Nistru, Chişinău, 1998.

External links 
 PRESA BASARABEANĂ de la începuturi pînă în anul 1957. Catalog

Defunct newspapers published in Romania
Feminist newspapers
Mass media in Chișinău
Newspapers published in Moldova
Publications established in 1933
Publications disestablished in 1934
Romanian-language newspapers published in Moldova